Orest Zerebko (September 15, 1887 – February 21, 1943) was a Galician-born journalist and political figure in Saskatchewan. He represented Redberry from 1938 to 1943 in the Legislative Assembly of Saskatchewan as a Liberal.

He was born in Horodenka, Austria-Hungary, the son of Elias Zerebko, of Ukrainian descent, and came to Canada in 1900. In 1913, Zerebko received a Bachelor of Arts degree from the University of Manitoba, becoming the first person of Ukrainian descent to graduate from a Canadian university. He was a contributor and later editor-in-chief for the weekly Ukrainian newspaper Ukrainskyi Holos. He died in office at home in Blaine Lake at the age of 55.

References 

1887 births
1943 deaths
People from Horodenka
People from the Kingdom of Galicia and Lodomeria
Ukrainian Austro-Hungarians
Ukrainian emigrants to Canada
Austro-Hungarian emigrants to Canada
University of Manitoba alumni
People from Blaine Lake, Saskatchewan
Saskatchewan Liberal Party MLAs